Shyra Quontae Ely (born August 9, 1983) is an American basketball player who last played in the Women's National Basketball Association (WNBA) for the Indiana Fever. The 6–2 power forward had originally played for two seasons with the San Antonio Silver Stars. She was selected with the 14th overall pick in the 2005 WNBA Draft in the second round, out of Tennessee.

Tennessee statistics
Source

High school
Ely played for Ben Davis High School in Indianapolis, Indiana, where she was named a WBCA All-American. She was also recognized as the 2001 Indiana Miss Basketball award winner.  She participated in the 2001 WBCA High School All-America Game where she scored two points.

Professional
Through three seasons in the league, she has scored 245 points, and has collected 132 rebounds, 48 assists, 17 steals, and 5 blocks. She scored a career high 15 points, in the 2005 season, against the Phoenix Mercury.

References

External links

Tennessee Volunteers bio

1983 births
Living people
All-American college women's basketball players
American expatriate basketball people in China
American women's basketball players
Basketball players from Indianapolis
Chicago Sky players
Indiana Fever players
Jiangsu Phoenix players
Parade High School All-Americans (girls' basketball)
Power forwards (basketball)
San Antonio Stars players
Seattle Storm players
Tennessee Lady Volunteers basketball players